Chernichenka is a rural locality (a village) in Lyakhovskoye Rural Settlement, Melenkovsky District, Vladimir Oblast, Russia. The population was 128 as of 2010. There are 2 streets.

Geography 
Chernichenka is located on the Chernichka River, 21 km east of Melenki (the district's administrative centre) by road. Lyakhi is the nearest rural locality.

References 

Rural localities in Melenkovsky District